Events from the year 1751 in Sweden

Incumbents
 Monarch – Frederick I then Adolf Frederick

Events

 January - Crown Prince Gustav is engaged to Sophia Magdalena of Denmark. 
 25 March - Frederick I of Sweden are succeeded by Adolf Frederick, King of Sweden.
 8 June - A great fire in Stockholm. 
 21 September – The final border between Sweden and Norway is recognized. 
 25 November – Coronation of Adolf Frederick, King of Sweden, and Queen Louisa Ulrika. 
 The Lapp Codicil of 1751 defines the border between Sweden and Norway and secures the right of the Sami to continue their nomadic lifestyle between the borders. 
 Axel Fredrik Cronstedt discovers nickel.
 Hönsgummans visa by Olaus Petri Carelius

Births

 18 February – Adolf Ulrik Wertmüller, painter  (died 1811)
 24 December - Lars von Engeström, diplomat (died 1826)
 1 December – Johan Henric Kellgren,  poet (died 1795)
 - Anna Rogel, charismatic preacher (died 1784)
 Charlotta Richardy, industrialist   (died 1831)

Deaths

 
 25 March - Frederick I of Sweden, monarch (born 1676)
 
 3 August - Christopher Polhem, scientist, inventor and industrialist  (born 1661)
 8 March - Hedvig Elisabet Strömfelt, courtier  (born 1687)

References

 
Years of the 18th century in Sweden
Sweden